Twonky may refer to:

 The Twonky, a 1953 science-fiction comedy film based on a short story written by Lewis Padgett
 Twonky Media Server, a multi-media content (photos, music, video, etc.) home server